James William Denny (November 20, 1838 – April 12, 1923) was a U.S. representative from Maryland.

Early life
James William Denny was born on November 20, 1838, in Frederick County, Virginia. Denny attended the academy of the Rev. William Johnson in Berryville, Virginia and graduated from the University of Virginia at Charlottesville.

Career
He served as principal of the Osage Seminary of Osceola, Missouri. During the Civil War, he returned to his native state and enlisted in Company A, thirty-ninth Virginia Battalion of Cavalry in the Confederate States Army. He served until 1863 when he was detailed for service at General Robert E. Lee's headquarters, where he continued until the surrender at Appomattox Court House. After the war, he returned to Clarke County, Virginia, and graduated from Judge Parker's Law School in Winchester. He moved to Baltimore, Maryland in 1867. He was admitted to the bar in Baltimore in 1868, and commenced practice there.

Denny was elected to the first branch of the Baltimore City Council in 1881, was reelected in 1882, and later became its president. He also served in the Maryland House of Delegates from 1888 to 1890, as colonel on the staff of Gov. Elihu Emory Jackson and as member of the Baltimore School Board for eight years.

Denny was elected as a Democrat to the fifty-sixth congress (March 4, 1899 – March 3, 1901), but was an unsuccessful candidate for reelection in 1900 to the fifty-seventh congress. He later was elected to the fifty-eighth congress (March 4, 1903 – March 3, 1905). He engaged in the practice of law until his death.

Personal life
Denny died on April 12, 1923, in Baltimore. He is interred in Loudon Park Cemetery.

References

1838 births
1923 deaths
Democratic Party members of the Maryland House of Delegates
Maryland lawyers
People from Frederick County, Virginia
University of Virginia alumni
Confederate States Army soldiers
Democratic Party members of the United States House of Representatives from Maryland
19th-century American lawyers
Baltimore City Council members